Newton is a settlement and as Newton-by-Tattenhall a former civil parish, now in the parish of Tattenhall and District in the Cheshire West and Chester district, and ceremonial county of Cheshire in England. In 2011 it had a population of 131, up from 116 in 2001. The civil parish was abolished in 2015 to form Tattenhall and District, part also went to Hargrave and Huxley.

See also

Listed buildings in Newton-by-Tattenhall

References

External links

Villages in Cheshire
Former civil parishes in Cheshire
Cheshire West and Chester